Pukatawagen Water Aerodrome, formerly , was an aerodrome located on Pukatawagan Lake, Pukatawagan, Manitoba, Canada.

The aerodrome has been de-registered and, as of 2011, was no longer listed in the Water Aerodrome Supplement.

See also
 Pukatawagan Airport

References

Defunct seaplane bases in Manitoba

Transport in Northern Manitoba